West Union is a village in Adams County, Ohio, United States, about  southeast of Cincinnati. The population was 3,241 at the 2010 census. It is the county seat of Adams County. West Union is served by West Union High School, the Adams County/Ohio Valley School District, and the West Union Public Library, a branch of the Adams County Public Library.

History
West Union was laid out in 1803. A post office called West Union has been in operation since 1805. The village was incorporated in 1859.

Geography
West Union is located at  (38.793979, -83.543500).

State Routes 41, 125, and 247 all intersect and run concurrently through the downtown area.

Ironically, West Union lies east of Union, Ohio, a city in Montgomery County approximately 10 miles north of Dayton. West Union and Union are not adjacent to each other, actually being approximately 120 miles from each other.

Demographics

2010 census
As of the census 3,421, 1,322 households, and 420 families living in the village. The racial makeup of the village was 97.4% White, 0.4% African American, 0.2% Native American, 0.2% Asian, 0.3% from other races, and 1.5% from two or more races. Hispanic or Latino of any race were 0.8% of the population.

There were 1,322 households, of which 32.4% had children under the age of 18 living with them, 38.5% were married couples living together, 17.6% had a female householder with no husband present, 4.8% had a male householder with no wife present, and 39.1% were non-families. 35.1% of all households were made up of individuals, and 16.5% had someone living alone who was 65 years of age or older. The average household size was 2.29 and the average family size was 2.91.

The median age in the village was 40.1 years. 23.4% of residents were under the age of 18; 9% were between the ages of 18 and 24; 22.8% were from 25 to 44; 24.5% were from 45 to 64, and 20.2% were 65 years of age or older. The gender makeup of the village was 45.5% male and 54.5% female.

2000 census
As of the census of 2000, there were 2,903 people, 1,242 households, and 757 families living in the village. The population density was 1,130.4 people per square mile (436.1/km). There were 13 housing units at an average density of 534.6 per square mile (206.3/km). The racial makeup of the village was 98.11% White, 0.24% African American, 0.002% Native American, 0.10% Asian, 0.07% Pacific Islander, 0.10% from other races, and 0.65% from two or more races. Hispanic or Latino of any race were 0.45% of the population.

There were 1,242 households, out of which 28.4% had children under the age of 18 living with them, 40.7% were married couples living together, 16.5% had a female householder with no husband present, and 39.0% were non-families. 35.5% of all households were made up of individuals, and 18.2% had someone living alone who was 65 years of age or older. The average household size was 2.20 and the average family size was 2.81.

In the village, the population was spread out, with 22.0% under the age of 18, 9.8% from 18 to 24, 25.2% from 25 to 44, 20.9% from 45 to 64, and 22.1% who were 65 years of age or older. The median age was 40 years. For every 100 females, there were 76.4 males. For every 100 females age 18 and over, there were 72.7 males.

The median income for a household in the village was $20,566, and the median income for a family was $25,531. Males had a median income of $25,104 versus $19,107 for females. The per capita income for the village was $13,302. About 15.8% of families and 21.8% of the population were below the poverty line, including 22.0% of those under age 18 and 12.1% of those age 65 or over.

Notable people
Edmund Wittenmyer, U.S. Army major general, taught school in West Union from 1876 to 1883

References

External links
 Village website

County seats in Ohio
Villages in Adams County, Ohio
Villages in Ohio
1803 establishments in Ohio